Events from the year 1706 in Sweden

Incumbents
 Monarch – Charles XII

Events
 
 2 February - Swedish victory in the Battle of Fraustadt.
  October 29 - Swedish defeat in the Battle of Kalisz.
 31 October - Peace with Saxony in the Treaty of Altranstädt (1706).
 
 
 The La troupe du Roi de Suede leaves Sweden and the theater of Bollhuset remains closed for fifteen years.

Births
 March 12 - Johan Pasch, painter (died 1769)
 May 22 - Samuel Troilius, archbishop  (died 1764)

Deaths

 Maria Daelder, banker and businessperson

References

External links

 
Years of the 18th century in Sweden
Sweden